Jannie G. Keyser-Borst is a Dutch cancer immunologist. She became Professor at Leiden University on 16 January 2019  At the Leiden University Medical Center she currently runs a research group investigating the regulation of the T cell response

Education and career

In 1980 she received her Master's degree in biology with chemistry at Leiden University. For the main part of her PhD she worked at the Dana–Farber Cancer Institute, Harvard Medical School in Boston, supervised by Prof. Dr. Cox P Terhorst. During this time she unraveled the structure of the CD3/T cell complex. After graduation she worked with Immunologists Dr Jan E de Vries and Dr Hergen Spits in the Netherlands. She obtained her Ph.D. degree from Leiden University in 1985. In 1987, she received a 5-year personal fellowship from The Netherlands Organization for Scientific Research.

In 1992, she became staff scientist at the Netherlands Cancer Institute and was named the head of the Division of Immunology in 2002. In 1999, she was appointed professor in Experimental Oncology at the University of Amsterdam.

Awards

She received the Van Loghem career award from the Dutch Society of Immunology in 2009.

In 2012, she was elected EMBO member.

In 2018 she received the Delphine Parrott award for inspiring female scientists by Megan MacLeod during the West of Scotland Immunology Group showcase at the University of Glasgow

Important work

 The structure of the human T cel receptor/CD3 complex.
The Gamma delta T cell and the development of the first Antibody to detect these cells in humans.
The identification of TNF receptor CD27 and CD70 ligand as important costimulatory system on T cells

References

Living people
Year of birth missing (living people)
Place of birth missing (living people)
Dutch women scientists
Cancer researchers
Women immunologists
Dutch immunologists
Dutch women physicians
Leiden University alumni
Academic staff of the University of Amsterdam
20th-century Dutch physicians
21st-century Dutch physicians
20th-century Dutch scientists
21st-century Dutch scientists
20th-century women physicians
21st-century women physicians
20th-century women scientists
21st-century women scientists
20th-century Dutch women
20th-century Dutch people